was a district located in Toyama Prefecture, Japan. It was originally part of Imizu District until 1896.

History

District Timeline
 April 1, 1896 - Himi District was created from a split within Imizu District, grouped by the town of Himi and 20 villages.
 April 1, 1954 - The villages of Kamishiro (Jindai), Busshōji, Fuse, Jūnichō, Hayakawa, Kume, Ao, Yabuta, Unami and Jorō were merged into the expanded city of Himi. Himi District dissolved as a result of this merger.

See also
 List of dissolved districts of Japan

References 

Former districts of Toyama Prefecture